Johannes Krahn (17 May 1908 – 17 October 1974) was a German architect and an academic teacher.

Career 
Born in Mainz, Johannes Krahn studied architecture from 1923 to 1927 at the Technische Lehranstalten Offenbach. He continued his studies 1927 to 1928 at the Kölner Werkschulen as Meisterschüler of Dominikus Böhm, who interested him in building churches. Krahn worked with Rudolf Schwarz from 1928 to 1940. He graduated as a civil engineer at the RWTH Aachen University.

In Frankfurt he was in charge of the rebuilding after World War II of the Paulskirche, starting in 1947, later he was on the team to rebuild the Städel. In 1950 he built the French Embassy in Bad Godesberg. In 1954 he completed at the Konstablerwache in Frankfurt the early skyscraper Bienenkorbhaus (Beehive House). His church building St. Wendel, Frankfurt (1957) has been compared to Le Corbusier in terms of materials and flow of light. In 1962 he built the St. Nikolaus von Flüe Catholic church in Wörsdorf. In 1965 Krahn created a variation on the interplay of  stonemasonry, glass and concrete of St. Wendel in St. Martin, Idstein. In 1966 he built St. Sebastian in Frankfurt. He died in Orselina, Switzerland.

Krahn was a teacher at the Kunstgewerbeschule Aachen and since 1954 a professor of architecture at the Städelschule Frankfurt. He was the director of the Städelschule from 1965 to 1970. With dedication to detail, he stressed function, construction and material, and refrained from pure ornament.

Awards
 1955 Member of the Akademie der Künste, Berlin
 1951 Gold medal for the Krahn-Stuhl (Krahn chair) at the 9th Triennale di Milano

Literature

References

External links 
 St. Wendel, Frankfurt (in German)
 St. Sebastian, Frankfurt (in German)
 St. Martin, Idstein

1908 births
1974 deaths
20th-century German architects
Modernist architects from Germany
Academic staff of RWTH Aachen University
Architects from Rhineland-Palatinate
People from Mainz
People from Rhenish Hesse